Dihydrokavain is one of the six major kavalactones found in the kava plant. It appears to contribute significantly to the anxiolytic effects of kava, based on a study in chicks.

Dihydrokavain bears some structural similarity to the strobilurins and has some fungicidal activity.

References

Kavalactones
Anxiolytics
GABAA receptor positive allosteric modulators
Monoamine oxidase inhibitors